Joseph Robinson  (23 February 1927 – 21 June 1999) was an English Anglican priest, most notably Master of the Temple from 1981 until 1999.

Robinson was educated at Upholland Grammar School, King's College London and St Boniface College, Warminster. He was ordained deacon in 1952 and priest in 1953. After a curacy at All Hallows' Church, Tottenham he was a Minor Canon and Sacrist of St Paul's Cathedral. As Sacrist he both organized and sang the state funeral service for Winston Churchill at St. Paul's on 30 January 1965. He was a Lecturer in Hebrew and Old Testament Studies at King's and personally tutored Desmond Tutu. From 1968 he was Canon Residentiary and Treasurer at Canterbury Cathedral until his appointment as Master of the Temple. In 1977, as Parish Clerk to Christ Church Greyfriars (Newgate Street), he served as Master of the Worshipful Company of Parish Clerks.


Published works

Books 

1972: 'The First Book of Kings.' (The Cambridge Bible Commentaries on the Old Testament) Cambridge: at the University Press 
1976: 'The Second Book of Kings.' (The Cambridge Bible Commentaries on the Old Testament) Cambridge: at the University Press

Guides etc. 
1971 A Christian understanding of the Old Testament: St Paul's Lecture [London]: [Council for Christian-Jewish Understanding] OCLC 236436  
 1973 'Pictures in Glass: Canterbury Cathedral' Canterbury: Cathedral Gifts OCLC 759064548
1978 'Canterbury Cathedral: walk-round guide' London: Pitkin Pictorials  OCLC 318564874
1983 'Canterbury Cathedral – Past & Present' Canterbury: Cathedral Gifts  OCLC 16836856
1997 'The Temple Church' Pitkin Guide. Norwich: Jarrold Publishing  OCLC 863447651

References 

1927 births
1999 deaths
People educated at Upholland Grammar School
Alumni of King's College London
Academics of King's College London
Fellows of King's College London
20th-century English Anglican priests
Masters of the Temple